Trichopagis is a genus of spiders in the family Thomisidae. It was first described in 1886 by Simon. , it contains only one species, Trichopagis manicata, found in Gabon, Guinea, South Africa, and Madagascar.

References

Thomisidae
Monotypic Araneomorphae genera
Spiders of Africa